SYL may refer to:

 Strapping Young Lad, a Canadian heavy metal band
 Strapping Young Lad (album), 2003
 Somali Youth League
 Socialist Youth League (disambiguation), a number of groups with that name
 National Union of University Students in Finland
 Sutlej Yamuna link canal (SYL canal) in India
 "SYL" (song), a song by Indian singer, rapper Sidhu Moose Wala
 Scottish Young Labour, the youth wing of the Scottish Labour Party
 Syon Lane railway station, London, England, National Rail station code
 Sylheti language, an Eastern Indo-Aryan language, ISO 639-3 code
 Yakutia Airlines, ICAO code

See also
 Syl, a given name or nickname